Chicoutimi is a provincial electoral district in the Saguenay–Lac-Saint-Jean region of Quebec, Canada that elects members to the National Assembly of Quebec. The district is located within the city of Saguenay and consists of part of the borough of Chicoutimi; it corresponds exactly to the territory of the former city of Chicoutimi prior to its February 18, 2002, amalgamation into the newly formed city of Saguenay.

It was created for the 1912 election from a part of Chicoutimi-Saguenay electoral district.

The riding has had the same boundaries since the 1988 redistribution.

Members of the Legislative Assembly / National Assembly

Election results

|-
 
|Liberal
|Joan Simard
|align="right"|12,128
|align="right"|41.61
|align="right"| +4.63

|-
|}

|-
 
|Liberal
|André Harvey  
|align="right"|12,919
|align="right"|36.98
|align="right"|

|-

|}

References

External links
Information
 Elections Quebec

Election results
 Election results (National Assembly)

Maps
 2011 map (PDF)
 2001 map (Flash)
2001–2011 changes (Flash)
1992–2001 changes (Flash)
 Electoral map of Saguenay–Lac-Saint-Jean region
 Quebec electoral map, 2011

Chicoutimi
Politics of Saguenay, Quebec